The non-marine molluscs of Madeira are a part of the molluscan fauna of Madeira (wildlife of Madeira). This list includes whole Madeira Autonomous Region, that includes Madeira Island, Porto Santo Island, Desertas Islands and Savage Islands.

A number of species of non-marine molluscs are found in the wild in Madeira.

There are 56 species of gastropods: ?? species of freshwater gastropods, 56 species of land gastropods (land snails) and ?? species of bivalves living in the wild.

The degree of endemism for the area of Madeira is about 84%.

Summary table of number of species
(Summary table is based on species counted in this list and include also those ones with question marks)

Freshwater gastropods

Land gastropods 

Discidae
 Discus guerinianus (R. T. Lowe, 1852) - endemic to Madeira

Ferussaciidae
 Amphorella iridescens
 Amphorella melampoides
 Amphorella producta
 Cecilioides eulima (Lowe, 1854)
 Cecilioides nyctelia
 Cylichnidia ovuliformis

Lauriidae
 Leiostyla abbreviata (R. T. Lowe, 1852) - globally extinct from Madeira
 Leiostyla gibba (R. T. Lowe, 1852) - globally extinct from Madeira
 Leiostyla lamellosa (R. T. Lowe, 1852) - globally extinct from Madeira

Hygromiidae
 Caseolus calvus galeatus (R. T. Lowe, 1862) - The subspecies Caseolus calvus galeatus is globally extinct.
 Caseolus commixtus R. T. Lowe, 1852
 Discula bulweri (Wood, 1828)
 Discula cheiranthicola
 Discula lyelliana (R. T. Lowe, 1852) - globally extinct from Deserta Grande Island
 Discula rotula (R. T. Lowe, 1831) - on Porto Santo Island
 Discula tabellata (R. T. Lowe, 1852)
 Discula tetrica (R. T. Lowe, 1862) - globally extinct from Bugio
 Geomitra delphinuloides (R. T. Lowe, 1860) - globally extinct from Madeira
 Geomitra grabhami (Wollaston, 1878) - globally extinct from Deserta Grande Island
 Geomitra moniziana Paiva, 1867
 Geomitra tiarella Webb & Berthelot, 1833
 Hystricella bicarinata (Sowerby, 1824)
 Hystricella echinulata
 Hystricella oxytropis
 Hystricella turricula (R. T. Lowe, 1831)
 Pseudocampylaea loweii (A. Férussac, 1835) - globally extinct from Madeira
 Serratorotula coronata (Deshayes, 1850) - synonym: Geomitra coronata

Helicidae
 Leptaxis simia hyaena (R. T. Lowe, 1852) - The subspecies Leptaxis simia hyaena is globally extinct from Bugio, Madeira

Bivalvia

See also
 List of non-marine molluscs of Portugal

Lists of molluscs of surrounding countries:
 List of non-marine molluscs of the Canary Islands

References

Further reading 
 Cameron R. A. D., Laurence M. Cook L. M., Goodfriend G. A. & Seddon M. B. (2006). "Fossil land snail faunas of Porto Santo, Madeiran archipelago: change and stasis in Pleistocene to recent times". Malacologia 49(1): 25–59. .
 Cameron R. A. D., da Cunha R.M.T. & Martins A. M. F. (2007). "Chance and necessity: land-snail faunas of São Miguel, Azores, compared with those of Madeira." Journal of Molluscan Studies 73(1): 11–21. 
 Cameron R. A. D., Cook L. M. & Gao G. (1996). "Variation in snail species widespread on Porto Santo, Madeiran archipelago." Journal of Molluscan Studies 62: 143–150. abstract.
  Cockerell T. D. A. (May–June 1922). "Porto Santo and its snails". Natural History, New York. 22(3): 268-270.
 Seddon M. B. (2008). "The landsnails of Madeira. An illustrated compendium of the landsnails and slugs of the Madeiran archipelago. Studies in Biodiversity and Systematics of Terrestrial Organisms from the National Museum of Wales". BIOTIR Reports 2: 204 pp. .
 book review: Cameron R. A. D. (2009). Folia Malacologica 17(1): 45–47. abstract

 
Mammals